KBUL may refer to:

 KBUL (AM), a radio station (970 AM) licensed to Billings, Montana, United States
 KBUL-FM, a radio station (98.1 FM) licensed to Carson City, Nevada, United States